Cante Alentejano is a Portuguese music genre based on vocal music without instrumentation from the Alentejo region. It was inscribed in 2014 in UNESCO's Representative List of the Intangible Cultural Heritage of Humanity, one of two Portuguese music traditions, the other being Fado.
Its origins come from a similar popular music genre created in the region of Minde by campinos. It is said that the habit of singing without instruments was common in bullherding as a means to coordinate efforts among the campinos.

See also 
 Alentejo
 Music of Portugal

References

Alentejo
Masterpieces of the Oral and Intangible Heritage of Humanity
Portuguese styles of music
Portuguese words and phrases